Explorer is a progressive trance album from producer trio Tilt.  This is Tilt's first full album of work after over ten years of music production.

Track listing
"The World Doesn't Know (Edit)" (8:31)
"Goodbye (Edit)" (8:30)
"Venus in Transit" (4:48)
"Electronic Poledancer" (8:55)
"Control Me" feat. Lianne Brookson (8:15)
"Tokyo Breaks (Breaks Mix)" feat. Laura Scott (7:01)
"Twelve" (9:27)
"Explorer" feat. Lianne Brookson (3:18)
"Antivalentine" (3:45)
"New Day" feat. Lianne Brookson (5:13)
"Crescendo" (4:08)

References

External links

2005 debut albums
Lost Language albums